Christophe Desbouillons (born 20 August 1958, in Caen, France) is a former professional footballer.

The defender, weighing 80 kg and 1m83, was picked by France U21s and took part in the 1977 FIFA World Youth Championship.

Career

Player 
 1970-1976 : SM Caen
 1976-1981 : Olympique lyonnais
 1981-1985 : FC Rouen
 1985-1987 : SCO Angers
 1987-1988 : CS Meaux

Player-manager 
 1988-1990 : ES La Rochelle (CFA)

Manager 
 1990-1994 : SCO Angers (centre de formation)
 1994-1998 : ES Viry-Châtillon (CFA)
 1998-2002 : SM Caen (Ligue 2) (Joint, in charge for two matches from 2000–2001)
 2004-2006 : FC Bourg-Péronnas (CFA)
 2007-2010 : AJS Ouistreham (CFA2)

References

1958 births
Living people
French footballers
Ligue 1 players
Ligue 2 players
Angers SCO players
Stade Malherbe Caen players
Olympique Lyonnais players
FC Rouen players
France youth international footballers
Stade Malherbe Caen managers
Footballers from Caen
Association football defenders
French football managers